CDCI may refer to:
Community Development Capital Initiative, 2010 investment initiative under the U.S.' Troubled Asset Relief Program
Cathay Drug Company Incorporated, Philippine pharmaceutical company
Cobourg CDCI West (Cobourg District Collegiate Institute West), high school in Couburg, Ontario, Canada

See also
CCDI (disambiguation)